Slowly Slowly may refer to:

 "Slowly Slowly" (Guru Randhawa song), a 2019 song by Guru Randhawa featuring Pitbull
 Slowly Slowly (band), an Australian rock band
 "Slowly, Slowly" (Magnapop song), a 1994 song by Magnapop

See also
 Slowly (disambiguation)